French Connection II is a 1975 American action thriller film starring Gene Hackman and directed by John Frankenheimer. It is a sequel to the 1971 Academy Award for Best Picture winner The French Connection. The film continues the story of the central character, Detective Jimmy "Popeye" Doyle, again played by Gene Hackman who won the Academy Award for Best Actor for the first film. In the film, Doyle travels to Marseille, France, where he is attempting to track down French drug-dealer Alain Charnier, played by Fernando Rey, who escaped at the end of the first film. Hackman and Rey are the only returning cast members.

Plot
Picking up four years after the original left off, narcotics officer Jimmy "Popeye" Doyle (Gene Hackman) is still searching for elusive drug kingpin Alain Charnier (Fernando Rey). Orders from his superiors send Doyle to Marseille, France, to track down the criminal mastermind and bust his drug ring. Once in France, Doyle is met by English-speaking Inspector Henri Barthélémy (Bernard Fresson), who resents his rude and nasty crimefighting demeanor. Doyle then begins to find himself as a fish out of water in France, where he is confronted with a language he cannot understand. Doyle is shown around the police station where he finds his desk is situated directly outside the toilets. He tells Barthélémy that he is not satisfied with this positioning and hopes it is not a joke at his expense. Barthélémy informs Doyle that he has read his personnel file and is aware of his reputation and especially hopes he has not brought a gun with him as it is strictly forbidden in France for visiting police officers from other countries to carry firearms.

Doyle continues to struggle with the language and tries to order drinks in a bar. He eventually makes himself understood, befriending a bartender while buying him drinks and they eventually stumble out of the bar together at closing time, followed by two men. The next day, while Doyle is watching a beach volleyball match, Charnier sees him from a restaurant below. Determined to find Charnier on his own, Popeye escapes from what are in fact French police escorts keeping watch on him. Doyle doesn't understand that he is being used as a bait by French police. The same night Charnier sends his men to capture Doyle, killing one of his watchers in the process, and take him to a secluded, seedy hotel in the old quarter for interrogation.

For several weeks, Doyle is injected with heroin in effort to force him into capitulation. Scenes of his growing addiction follow, including one in which an elderly lady (Cathleen Nesbitt) visits him in his befuddled state. She talks to him, declaring herself to be English, and saying that her son is "just like" him, while stroking his arm. Initially she seems compassionate to his plight, but a change in the camera angle reveals her 'track' marks. The gentle old lady steals his watch.

Meanwhile, Barthélémy has sent police everywhere to search for Doyle. Charnier interrogates a needy Doyle about what he knows, but Doyle says he was sent here just because he is the only one who can recognize him. Charnier believes Doyle, so lets him go after one massive injection. Doyle is dumped barely alive but addicted in front of police headquarters. Grueling scenes of resuscitation and drug withdrawal follow. In his effort to save both Doyle's life and his reputation, Barthélémy immediately quarantines Doyle in the police cells and begins his cold turkey withdrawal from the heroin. Supervising his recovery, and at his side with both emotional support and taunts questioning his toughness, Barthélémy ensures that Doyle completes the cycle of physical withdrawal. When he is well enough to be on his feet, Doyle starts back on the road to regaining his physical fitness. He searches Marseille and, finding the hideout he was brought to, sets it on fire. He breaks into a room at the hotel and discovers Charnier's henchmen, whom he pursues and interrogates as to Charnier's whereabouts. A delivery of opium is taking place at the harbor. Doyle, Barthélémy and other inspectors rush to the boat that is being unloaded and engage Charnier's henchmen in a gun battle in a dry dock. The thugs open the spillways, water starts rushing in, Doyle and Barthélémy are trapped. The henchmen and a policeman are killed, but Doyle rescues Barthélémy.

French police hold Doyle responsible for the policeman's death and want to send him home, but Doyle believes that the deal is not done and convinces Barthélémy, who "owes him one", to keep watch over the ship. They eventually spot the ship's captain on his way to meet Charnier's lieutenant, whom Doyle recognizes. A tailing ensues taking the police to the drug warehouse, which they raid, but are met with a barrage of fire. Doyle picks up a gun and kills a gangster machine-gunning them. Charnier's lieutenant and other men escape with the drugs on board a van, but Barthélémy closes the warehouse door and stops them. Meanwhile, once again Charnier has escaped. Doyle makes an exhausting foot chase of Charnier, who is sailing out of the harbor on his yacht. After spotting Charnier at the distance, Doyle catches up with the boat at the end of the pier, takes his gun out of his holster, and calls Charnier's name. In a few seconds, a surprised Charnier turns around and is shot dead by Doyle.

Cast

Production
John Frankenheimer had lived in France for a number of years when he agreed to make the film:
I like the script, I like the characters, I like the Hackman character in France and not speaking a word of French. It's a very difficult film because we want in no way to rip off the first one, which is one of the best films I've ever seen. I want to make a movie that stands on its own as a movie.
Frankenheimer also admitted he made the film in part because of the financial failure of The Impossible Object. "I want to make pictures that one sees", he said. "There's a great public out there and you have to reach them; otherwise you're not in the movie business."

Score
The music was composed and conducted by Don Ellis, who returned from the original film. A soundtrack CD was released by Film Score Monthly in 2005 and paired with the music from the first film.

Reception
On release, French Connection II attracted positive reactions from the press and fared well at the box office, though nowhere near as well as its predecessor. The review aggregator Rotten Tomatoes gives the film a score of 84% based on 37 reviews, and a rating average of 6.7/10.

Roger Ebert of the Chicago Sun-Times gave the film two and a half out of four stars, feeling that Doyle's heroin detox sequence halfway through the film, while well-acted by Hackman, stripped the film's momentum.  He said that "if Frankenheimer and his screenplay don't do justice to the character (of Det. Jimmy "Popeye" Doyle), they at least do justice to the genre, and this is better than most of the many cop movies that followed The French Connection into release."

Vincent Canby wrote in his review in The New York Times, "Popeye is a colorful and interesting — though hardly noble — character, and when the Marseille drug people kidnap him, forcibly create a heroin habit in him, and then release him, you have a very special kind of jeopardy that the film and Mr. Hackman exploit most effectively."

Arthur D. Murphy of Variety called the film "an intelligent action melodrama" with a performance from Hackman that was so "excellent" as to "suggest the possibility of winning another major award for the same character in a sequel film."

Gene Siskel of the Chicago Tribune awarded three stars out of four and wrote, "Too many Popeye histrionics turns one of the screen's more compelling characters into a bit of a cartoon. And when Hackman is shot full of heroin by the Frenchman's thugs, once again the action is overplayed ... Despite these objections, 'French Connection II' concludes with a wallop that argues persuasively for its being seen."

Paul D. Zimmerman wrote in Newsweek that Doyle's drug addiction in the middle of the film "stalls the story" and that the action-packed climax "seems executed for those seeking the shoot-'em-up sequel that Frankenheimer apparently wanted to avoid. If the movie ultimately doesn't work, this can be said in Frankenheimer's defense: that, with every right and probably much pressure to do so, he refused to rip off 'The French Connection' as so many films with other names already had."

Charles Champlin of the Los Angeles Times wrote, "'French Connection II' is an audience picture, bold and vigorous, opting for action rather than nuance. There is none of the lingering irony of 'French Connection I.' Vivid characterizations and plot are all, and they are whiz-bang."

Gary Arnold of The Washington Post wrote that "this is not a sequel that was really crying to be made ... John Frankenheimer's direction of 'French Connection II' isn't bad, but it also isn't ingenious or exciting enough to compensate for the perfunctory screenwriting."

"French Connection II" earned North American rentals of $5.6 million, surpassing its $4.3 million budget.  On the DVD commentary of the film, lead actor Gene Hackman remarked that the disappointing box office may have been due to the four-year gap between releases of the original and its sequel.

In 2009, Empire rated French Connection II to be the 19th greatest film sequel.

See also
 List of American films of 1975

References

External links
 
 
 
 

1975 films
20th Century Fox films
American action thriller films
American crime thriller films
1970s English-language films
Films directed by John Frankenheimer
Films set in Marseille
American sequel films
Films about the French Connection
1970s action thriller films
1970s crime thriller films
American police detective films
Films scored by Don Ellis
American neo-noir films
Films about heroin addiction
1970s American films